Old Park is a hamlet in the parish of Liskeard, Cornwall, England, UK.

References

Hamlets in Cornwall